Karbunarë is a former municipality in the Fier County, western Albania. At the 2015 local government reform it became a subdivision of the municipality Lushnjë. The population at the 2011 census was 4,193. The municipal unit has nine villages under its jurisdiction: Karbunarë e Sipërme, Stan-Karbunarë, Kashtbardhë, Zgjanë, Balaj, Kasharaj, Murriz, Skilaj, and Biçakaj. Although Karbunara is located in the Myzeqe region where many of Albanian Orthodox backgrounds live, it is a center of the heterodox Islamic Halveti Order, which is often mistaken for (but not the same as) the Bektashi Order. The town of Karbunara contains both a Halveti tekke and a Halveti tyrbe. In addition to the numerous residents of Halveti background, there are also some of Orthodox backgrounds as well as non-Halveti Muslim backgrounds, and in modern days there are also many irreligious individuals.

References

Former municipalities in Fier County
Administrative units of Lushnjë